Calytheca is a genus of beetles in the family Ptinidae. There are at least two described species in Calytheca, C. elongata White 1973 and C. convexa White.

References

Further reading

 
 
 
 
 

Ptinidae